The Women's World Chess Championship 2008 took place from August 28, 2008 to September 18 in Nalchik, Russia.  It was won by Alexandra Kosteniuk, who beat Hou Yifan in the final by 2½ to 1½.

For the fifth time, the championship took the form of a 64-player knock-out tournament.

Participants

Players were seeded by their Elo ratings (July 2008 list), except that defending champion Xu Yuhua was the no. 1 seed.

Qualification paths

WC: Women's World Champion and semi-finalists of the Women's World Chess Championship 2006 (3)
J06 and J07: World Junior Champions 2006 and 2007
R: Rating (average of the FIDE rating lists of July 2006 and January 2007) (6)
E06 and E07: European Individual Chess Championships 2006 and 2007 (28)
AM: American Continental Chess Championship 2007 (2)

AS: Asian Chess Championship 2007 (4)
AF: African Chess Championship 2007 (3)
Z2.1 (3), Z2.3, Z2.4, Z2.5, Z3.1, Z3.2, Z3.3, Z3.4, Z3.5 (4): Zonal tournaments
PN: FIDE President nominee (2)

Absentees
The world's no. 1 female player (and 22nd overall), Judit Polgár, never competed for the Women's World Championship and did not play this time either. World no. 3 and ex-champion, Xie Jun, had played little chess in recent years (four rated games since 2005) and also did not appear. Also 2006 World Championship's runner-up Alisa Galliamova didn't participate. Other absentees from the top 20 were Kateryna Lahno (ranked 12th), ex-champion Zhu Chen (15th) and Elina Danielian (16 th).

Some players refused to go to Nalchik. In their letters to FIDE, Canadian Natalia Khoudgarian and American Irina Krush both cited the general safety in the region of North Caucasus.

More players protested after the start of the 2008 South Ossetia war. On 12 August 2008, six Georgian players published an open letter asking to move the Championship to a safer place, which was endorsed by several other players (Monika Soćko, Irina Krush, Iweta Rajlich, Ketino Kachiani-Gersinska, Tea Bosboom-Lanchava, Claudia Amura, and Marie Sebag). On 15 August, the Chess Federation of Georgia published an open letter stating that the Georgian players will not participate in the Championship unless it is moved to another country. Argentinian Claudia Amura, whose opponent in the first round is Georgian Lela Javakhishvili, also published a letter to FIDE asking for the Championship to be moved.

The FIDE president Kirsan Ilyumzhinov published two letters in reply, on 13 August and 19 August. In his letters, he confirmed that the Championship would be held in Nalchik, appealed to everyone not to mix politics and sport, and stated that the organizers provided all the necessary security. This was seconded by Boris Kutin, president of the European Chess Union, and Arsen Kanokov, president of Kabardino-Balkaria and the chairman of the organizing committee. On 21 August, Ilyumzhinov published a letter to Georgian president Mikhail Saakashvili asking him to let Georgian players participate.

A total of 11 players did not arrive at the Championship. Besides the six Georgian players (Maia Chiburdanidze, Lela Javakhishvili, Maia Lomineishvili, Nino Khurtsidze, Sopiko Khukhashvili, and Sopio Gvetadze), these were Marie Sebag (France), Irina Krush (United States), Ekaterina Korbut (Russia), Tea Bosboom-Lanchava (Netherlands), and Karen Zapata (Peru).

Tournament format

The Championship was conducted as a single-elimination tournament with 64 players and six rounds. In each encounter, players played two games at normal time controls (90 minutes for the first 40 moves followed by 30 minutes for the rest of the game, with an increment of 30 seconds per move from move one). If the score after two games was level, the tie-break was played. In the tie-break, two rapid games were played (25 minutes for the game, with addition of 10 seconds after each move). If the score was level after the rapid games, two blitz games were played (5 minutes for the game, with addition of 10 seconds after each move). If the score was level after the blitz, the decisive armageddon game was played. The time control was 6 minutes for White and 5 minutes for Black, with no addition. If the game was drawn, Black is declared the winner. The colours in the armageddon games were chosen by the player who won the drawing of lots.

In the final, four regular games were played instead of two, and the first (rapid) phase of tie-break would also have consisted of four games.

Ruling appeal

The final tiebreak game in the first round match between Monika Soćko and Sabina-Francesca Foisor ended in controversy. It was an armageddon blitz game in which Soćko (as White) had 6 minutes compared to 5 minutes Foisor (as Black), but White must win the game to advance to the next round whereas Black only needed to draw (or win).  With time running out, a position was reached in which each player had only a king and a knight, a material combination which is a draw under normal circumstances.  Just after this, Foisor's time ran out and the arbiter Zsuzsanna Veroci ruled it a draw, meaning that Foisor would advance. Soćko immediately protested, showing a position where checkmate is possible (but cannot be forced) and reminding the arbiters of the FIDE rules of chess which state that if one player runs out of time and the opponent has the possibility of checkmate, that player loses. Soćko filed an appeal, and the Appeals Committee agreed that she was correct on the rules. The game was ruled a win for Soćko and she advanced to the next round.

Schedule

Round 1: 29 August and 30 August, with tiebreaks on 31 August
Round 2: 1 September and 2 September, with tiebreaks on 3 September
Round 3: 4 September and 5 September, with tiebreaks on 6 September
Quarterfinals: 7 September and 8 September, with tiebreaks on 9 September
Semifinals: 10 September and 11 September, with tiebreaks on 12 September
Final: 14 September to 17 September, with tiebreaks on 18 September

Results

Final Match

{| class="wikitable" style="text-align:center"
|+Women's World Chess Championship Final 2008
|-
! !! 1 !! 2 !! 3 !! 4 !! Total
|-
| align=left | 
| style="background:black; color:white"| 1 || ½ ||style="background:black; color:white"| ½ || ½ || 2½
|-
| align=left | 
| 0 ||style="background:black; color:white"| ½ || ½ ||style="background:black; color:white"| ½ || 1½
|}

Bracket

References

External links
Official website
Chessdom: World Women Chess Championship 2008 official rules
Preview at ChessBase

2008 in chess
Women's World Chess Championships
Chess Championship
Chess in Russia
2008 in Russia